Serramazzoni is a comune (municipality) in the Province of Modena in the Italian region Emilia-Romagna, located about  west of Bologna and about  southwest of Modena.

Serramazzoni borders the following municipalities: Fiorano Modenese, Maranello, Marano sul Panaro, Pavullo nel Frignano, Polinago, Prignano sulla Secchia, Sassuolo.

History 
The first historical mention of Serramazzoni dates to 1327, when it was called Serra de Legorzano.

Main sights
Falls of Rio delle Borre
Via Vandelli
Sasso delle Streghe
Salsa della Cintora
Falls of Bucamante
National Museum of Antic Rose
Romanesque Church of Santa Maria Assunta

Districts
Serramazzoni is divided into the  districts: Faeto, Ligorzano, Monfestino, Montagnana, Pazzano, Pompeano, Rocca Santa Maria, Riccò, San Dalmazio, Selva, Stella, Valle, Varana.

People 
Gianni Bui, football player
Luca Toni, football player

References

External links
 Official website

Cities and towns in Emilia-Romagna